François Pinault (born 21 August 1936) is a French billionaire businessman, founder of the luxury group Kering and the investment holding company Artémis.

Pinault started his business in the timber industry in the early 1960s. Taken public in 1988, his company invested in specialty store chains and changed its name to Pinault-Printemps-Redoute (PPR). By the end of 1999, PPR shifted towards luxury and fashion. In 2003, he passed on the management of his companies to his elder son François-Henri to follow his passion for contemporary art.

Early life
François Pinault was born on 21 August 1936 in Les Champs-Géraux, a commune in the north of Brittany in the west of France. His father was a timber trader.

Pinault grew up in the rural French countryside, beginning his career working for his family's timber business. He dropped out of school at the age of 16 from the College Saint-Martin in Rennes. In 1956, he enlisted in the military during the Algerian war. Afterwards, he returned to the family business, which he sold following his father's death.

In 1962, he married Louise Gautier. They had three children: François-Henri, Dominique, and Laurence Pinault. The couple divorced five years later, and in 1970, Pinault married Maryvonne Campbell, an antique trader in Rennes who introduced him to the world of art. His first art purchases date back to this period.

Career 

François Pinault started his first business in 1963 as a wood-trading company. Pinault SA grew strongly and diversified its portfolio by acquiring several companies facing bankruptcy, including Chapelle Darblay, to restructure them. On 25 October 1988, Pinault SA was taken public in the Paris stock exchange and started to invest in specialty store chains. He acquired a majority stake in CFAO (specialized distribution in Africa), Conforama (furnishing retailer), Printemps (department store), La Redoute (mail order), and Fnac (books and electronics retailer). Pinault SA was renamed Pinault-Printemps-Redoute (PPR) in 1993.

In 1992, Pinault set up the holding company Artémis to manage the Pinault family's investments. Controlled 100% by Pinault and his family, Artémis controls the vineyards Château Latour (Bordeaux), Clos de Tart (Bourgogne), Domaine d'Eugénie (Vosne-Romanée), Château Grillet (Rhône Valley), Eisele Vineyard (Napa Valley), and the champagne Jacquesson. Artémis bought the news magazine Le Point in 1997, the auction house Christie's in 1998, and the luxury cruise company Ponant in 2015. Pinault has been the owner of the Rennes football club since 1998.

By the end of century, François Pinault started to shift his business focus from retail to luxury. In March 1999, Pinault-Printemps-Redoute purchased a controlling 42% stake of the Gucci Group for $3 billion, and bought the Yves Saint Laurent company. Pinault then purchased the French jewelry company Boucheron in 2000, Balenciaga in 2001, and the British fashion house Alexander McQueen. In May 2003, he handed over the management of his companies to his son François-Henri who pursued the consolidation of the luxury group with new acquisitions (Brioni, Girard-Perregaux, Pomellato...) and changed the group's name to Kering in 2013.

Art 

Pinault bought his first significant painting, Cour de ferme by Paul Sérusier, in 1980. He collected art of the 20th century (Mondrian, Picasso, Man Ray, ...) before following contemporary artists (David Hammons, Rudolf Stingel, Damien Hirst, Jeff Koons, Subodh Gupta, Paul McCarthy, Bruce Nauman, Donald Judd, Robert Ryman, ...). In 2019, his art collection contained approximately 5,000 works.

In 2005, François Pinault bought the company Palazzo Grassi SpA which operated the Palazzo Grassi in Venice. The Japanese architect Tadao Ando renovated the historical building which housed the first exhibition of Pinault Collection in 2006. One year later, the Venice city council awarded the tender of the Punta della Dogana, which had been abandoned for 30 years, to Pinault Collection, adding 5,000 m² to the Palazzo Grassi space in Venice. Tadao Ando also restored this historical site, which reopened to the public in June 2009.  In 2013, Pinault achieved the third chapter of his cultural project in Venice with the renovation and transformation of the Teatrino, an open-air theater in ruins. Designed once again by Tadao Ando, the new Teatrino holds a 225-seat auditorium.

In 2016, Pinault and the city of Paris announced their plan to turn the Bourse de commerce in the center of Paris (1st arrondissement) into a new, Pinault Collection-branded contemporary art museum. Tadao Ando was put in charge of transforming the historic building. The museum opened in May 2021.In 2014, François Pinault launched, through the Pinault Collection, an artist residency program in Lens (Northern France) which opened in 2015. In 2015, in memory of his friend the writer (and Picasso biographer) Pierre Daix who passed away in 2014, Pinault created the Pierre Daix Prize to reward an outstanding book on modern and contemporary art every year.

Other commitments

Environment 
In 1990, following a fire in the Paimpont forest in Brittany, Pinault immediately financed the reforestation project. In 2000, he provided a significant financial assistance to help the islands in Brittany affected by the oil spill following the sinking of the Erika.

Historical buildings 
In 2012, he bought the Villa Greystones in Dinard, France, designed by Michel Roux-Spitz (monument historique in 2019). In 2018, Pinault made a significant contribution to the restoration of Victor Hugo's house, the Hauteville House, in Guernsey.

After the Notre Dame de Paris fire on April 15th, 2019, the Pinault family pledged 100 million euros as a donation to the reconstruction works and repairs of the cathedral.

In 2021, he bought the hôtel particulier Hôtel de Cavoye in the 7th arrondissement of Paris for 80 million euros. He is also the owner of the château de la Mormaire (Yvelines), and of the Hôtel de Clermont-Tonnerre and the Hôtel Choiseul-Praslin (Paris). In 2022, he pledged to finance the restoration of the Chapelle Saint-Michel on top of the Monts d'Arrée that was deteriorated by a wildfire and bought the villa Bel-Esbat located a few hundred meters away from Villa Greystones in Dinard.

Wealth
As of 31 January 2021, according to Forbes, Pinault had a net worth estimated at $43.4 billion.

As of October 2022, according to the Bloomberg Billionaires Index, Pinault's wealth was estimated at US$33.5 billion, making him the 31st richest person in the world.

Awards
1958: Military Value Cross
2006: Breton of the Year by Armor Magazine
2006, 2007: Most influential personality in the art world by ArtReview
2011: Grand officier de la Légion d'honneur
2016: Grand Officer of the Ordine della Stella d'Italia
2017: Grand Croix de la Légion d'honneur

Further reading

Dal Co, Francesco (2009). Tadao Ando for François Pinault: From Ile Seguin to Punta Della Dogana. Mondadori Electa. .
Anfam, David (2006). Where Are We Going?: Selections from the Francois Pinault Collection. Skira. .

References

External links
Ranking on ArtReview Power List

1936 births
People from Côtes-d'Armor
Businesspeople from Brittany
20th-century French businesspeople
21st-century French businesspeople
French businesspeople in fashion
French company founders
French art collectors
French billionaires
French military personnel of the Algerian War
Grand Croix of the Légion d'honneur
Pinault family
Kering people
Living people